The 2024 World Athletics Cross Country Championships will be held in Medulin and Pula, Croatia, on 10 and 11 February 2024.

References

2024
World Cross Country Championships
International athletics competitions hosted by Croatia
Cross country running in Croatia
Athletics World Cross Country Championships
World Athletics Cross Country